There For Tomorrow is the second 
EP by American alternative rock band There for Tomorrow. It was released on August 5, 2008, through Hopeless Records. Four of the previous tracks, "Addiction And Her Name", "Pages", "Waiting" and "Taking Chances" have been remixed and re-recorded since appearing on the band's previous EP, Pages. Three new tracks has been made "Deadlines", "Remember When (Used To Be Used To Be)", and "No More Room To Breathe". Along with the EP, a music video has been released for the song "No More Room To Breathe".

Track listing

Development 
Four of the previous tracks, "Addiction And Her Name", "Pages", "Waiting" and "Taking Chances" have been remixed and re-recorded since appearing on the band's previous EP, Pages. There are some songs that would have made it in the EP. For example, Stories, Wish You Away, and Maika's  Love Song (which is now Burn The Night Away). Of Couse, they all made it to their next album "A Little Faster". And on June 30th, they released a music video for "No More Room To Breathe".

Personnel
Maika Maile – lead vocals, rhythm guitar, programming, 
Christian Climer – lead guitar, backing vocals,
Jay Enriquez – bass, backing vocals,
Christopher Kamrada – drums, samples,

References

External links
Official MySpace Profile
Official YouTube channel

2008 EPs
There for Tomorrow albums
Hopeless Records EPs
Albums produced by James Paul Wisner